Evenstad Church is a parish church of the Church of Norway in Stor-Elvdal Municipality in Innlandet county, Norway. It is located in the village of Evenstad. It is one of the churches for the Stor-Elvdal parish which is part of the Sør-Østerdal prosti (deanery) in the Diocese of Hamar. The brown, wooden church was built in a long church design in 1904 using plans drawn up by the architect Victor Nordan. The church seats about 120 people.

History
Evenstad chapel (later upgraded to a church status) was built because of the work of Anne Evenstad, who also financed the construction. Simen Rusten provided land for the chapel and burial ground. The church is located between the villages of Evenstad and Rasta, and it is said that the location near Rasta station was chosen to make it easier for the priest and organist, who often came to the place by train. The building was designed by Victor Nordan and the lead builder was Martin O. Bråten from Åsnes. The new building was consecrated on 22 July 1904. The cemetery at the church was formally opened in 1907 and is located mainly on the south side of the church.

Media gallery

See also
List of churches in Hamar

References

Stor-Elvdal
Churches in Innlandet
Long churches in Norway
Wooden churches in Norway
20th-century Church of Norway church buildings
Churches completed in 1904
1904 establishments in Norway